Dartmoor may refer to:

Places

Dartmoor, Victoria, a rural township in Australia
Dartmoor, an area of moorland in England
Dartmoor (HM Prison), a men's prison in England
Dartmoor, New Zealand, a rural locality in New Zealand
Dartmoor, West Virginia, an unincorporated community in the United States

Other
Dartmoor Pony, a horse breed